Srboljub Krivokuća (14 March 1928 – 22 December 2002) was a Yugoslav and Serbian football manager and player.

Club career
Krivokuća played for Red Star Belgrade on two occasions, winning three Yugoslav First League titles (1952–53, 1955–56, and 1956–57). He also spent two seasons abroad with Wormatia Worms in West Germany (1962–1964).

International career
At international level, Krivokuća was capped seven times for Yugoslavia between 1956 and 1961. He was a member of the team at two World Cups in 1958 and 1962.

Managerial career
After hanging up his boots, Krivokuća served as manager of several clubs in Yugoslavia and Kuwait.

Honours
Red Star Belgrade
 Yugoslav First League: 1952–53, 1955–56, 1956–57
OFK Beograd
 Yugoslav Cup: 1961–62

References

External links
 
 
 

1928 births
2002 deaths
People from Ivanjica
Yugoslav footballers
Serbian footballers
Association football goalkeepers
Yugoslavia international footballers
1958 FIFA World Cup players
1962 FIFA World Cup players
FK Javor Ivanjica players
FK Budućnost Podgorica players
Red Star Belgrade footballers
FK Vojvodina players
OFK Beograd players
Wormatia Worms players
Yugoslav First League players
Yugoslav expatriate footballers
Expatriate footballers in Germany
Yugoslav expatriate sportspeople in Germany
Yugoslav football managers
Serbian football managers
Yugoslav expatriate football managers
Expatriate football managers in Kuwait
Yugoslav expatriate sportspeople in Kuwait